Egon Drews (1 June 1926 – 13 January 2011) was a West German flatwater canoer who competed in the 1950s. Competing in two Summer Olympics, he won two bronze medals at Helsinki in 1952, earning them in the C-2 1000 m and C-2 10000 m events.

References
 Egon Drews' profile at Sports Reference.com

1926 births
2011 deaths
Canoeists at the 1952 Summer Olympics
Canoeists at the 1956 Summer Olympics
German male canoeists
Olympic canoeists of the United Team of Germany
Olympic canoeists of West Germany
Olympic bronze medalists for West Germany
Olympic medalists in canoeing
Medalists at the 1952 Summer Olympics